The Distillers is the debut album by the American punk rock band The Distillers, released in 2000.

Track listing
All tracks written by Brody Dalle except where noted.
"Oh Serena" – 2:32
"Idoless" – 2:28
"The World Comes Tumblin'" – 3:08
"L.A. Girl" – 2:59
"Distilla Truant" – 2:24
"Ask the Angels" (Ivan Kral, Patti Smith) – 3:10
"Oldscratch" – 0:43
"Girlfixer" (Dalle, Kim Fuellman) – 1:14
"Open Sky" – 3:07
"Red Carpet and Rebellion" – 3:08
"Colossus U.S.A." – 2:15
"Blackheart" – 1:45
"Gypsy Rose Lee" – 3:54
"The Blackest Years" – 7:28

Notes
After the final track, "The Blackest Years", there is a hidden track. It is an early version of "Young Girls" which appears on the next album, Sing Sing Death House. But this version contains different lyrics and is performed by Brody Dalle solo on electric guitar.
"The World Comes Tumblin'" has been covered by The Wildhearts on their album of covers, Stop Us If You've Heard This One Before, Vol 1.

Personnel
The Distillers
Brody Dalle – vocals, guitar
Kim "Chi" Fuellman – bass, vocals
Rose Casper – guitar
Matt Young – drums

Additional musician
Ronnie King – piano on "Ask the Angels"

Production 
Producer: Thomas "TJ" Johnson – producer, engineer, mixing
Donnell Cameron – assistant engineer
Jay Gordon – assistant engineer
Gene Grimaldi – mastering
Mike "Sak" Fasano – drum technician
Jesse Fischer – art direction 
Brody Dalle – art direction 
B.J. Papas – photography

References

The Distillers albums
2000 debut albums
Hellcat Records albums